Aston Villa Women Football Club is the women's football team of Aston Villa, currently playing in the English women's Super League. The club has been in existence since 1973. Originally titled Solihull F.C., the team affiliated to Aston Villa in 1989, becoming Villa Aztecs, and became the official Aston Villa women's side in 1996. The club have a senior team, a reserve team and several other teams of younger age groups under a Regional Talent Club FA license.

History
Aston Villa Women Football Club was formed in 1973 as Solihull FC. When Aston Villa asked for help in forming a ladies team in 1989, Solihull responded. The club agreed to change their name in 1996 to become the officially recognised ladies team of Aston Villa.

As Villa Aztecs, they reached the 1995 League Cup Final but lost 2–0 to Wimbledon, and played in the 1995–96 FA Women's Premier League but were relegated.

The senior team, renamed to Aston Villa Ladies F.C., continued to play mainly in the 2nd-tier Northern Division. The club won promotion twice more and played in the FA Women's Premier League National Division in 1999–2000 and in 2003–04, but ended in the relegation zone in both seasons.

The Lady Villans won the Northern Division for the fourth time in 2011 and gained promotion to the WPL National Division, which had become the 2nd tier below the FA WSL.

On 5 May 2013, the club had its greatest achievement by winning its first ever trophy, the Women's Premier League Cup, beating Leeds United Ladies 5–4 on penalties.

In 2014 they were one of ten teams who were elected to WSL2, 
and in 2018 to the Women's Championship.

On 4 July 2019, the team was renamed Aston Villa Women F.C., CEO Christian Purslow, said that the name "aligns more appropriately with women’s football in this country". On the same day, Chief Commercial Officer, Nicola Ibbetson, was elected to the FA WSL and Women's Championship board - making Aston Villa Women one of only two Championship clubs to have a representative on the board.

In 2019–20, Villa won promotion to the WSL and entered the top flight of women's football for the first time since 2004. For the 2022-23 Women's Super League season the women will play four of their eleven home matches at Villa Park, where the men's team play.

Players

Current squad

Out on loan

Former players

Honours 

 FA Women's Premier League (Northern Division) (Level 2)  Winners (4): 1992–93, 1994–95, 2002–03, 2010–11
 FA Women's Premier League Cup  Winners (1): 2012–13
 FA Women's Championship (Level 2)  Winners (1): 2019–20

Non-playing staff

Corporate hierarchy 

Reference:

Management hierarchy

Regional Talent Club
The club also run several other teams under the auspices of an FA Tier Two Regional Talent Club. This centre aims to develop the talent from within the local area. The RTC teams include an under-10, under-12, under-14, under-16 and development squad

In August 2010, Aston Villa Women FC supplied eight players to a 30-strong England Under-17 training camp.

References

External links 
 AVFC Ladies official website

 
Women
Sport in Birmingham, West Midlands
Women's football clubs in England
Association football clubs established in 1973
1973 establishments in England
Women's Championship (England) teams
FA Women's National League teams